Mary Lyn Ray (born 1946) is an American author of children's literature, a conservationist, and a historic preservationist. Her books' depictions of nature have been praised by outlets including Publishers Weekly, the School Library Journal, The Horn Book Magazine, and The Washington Post, which listed her book Stars among its best children's books of 2011. The New York Times likened her 2014 book Go to Sleep, Little Farm to Goodnight Moon.

Biography
Mary Lyn Ray was born in 1946 in Monroe, Louisiana and grew up in Little Rock, Arkansas. In 1968 she received an A.B. in American studies from Smith College in 1968. In 1970, she received an M.A. in early American arts and culture from the University of Delaware. She was a Winterthur Fellow at the Winterthur Museum.

In 1984, she moved to a farmhouse in East Danbury, Connecticut. The scenery of her new home would inspire her future books. For instance, Ray was inspired to write the book Pumpkins when her sister jokingly suggested that she plant pumpkins on her property to sell, and her book Alvah and Arvilla was inspired by the wedding of two of her neighbors, who ran a dairy farm. 

Ray's 2011 book Stars was nominated for the The E.B. White Read Aloud Award. Go to Sleep, Little Farm and her 2015 book Goodnight, Good Dog received Charlotte Zolotow Award commendations.

Ray is also a conservationist and has received several commendations for her work, including New Hampshire Conservationist of the Year in 1989.

Bibliography
Angel Baskets: A Little Story about the Shakers (1987)
Pumpkins (1992)
A Rumbly Tumbly Glittery Gritty Place (1993).
Alvah and Arvilla (1994)
Pianna (1994)
Shaker Boy (1994)
Mud (1996)
Basket Moon (1998)
Red Rubber Boot Day (2000)
All Aboard! (2002)
Welcome, Brown Bird (2004)
Christmas Farm (2008)
Stars (2011)
Boom! (2013)
Deer Dancer (2014)
Go to Sleep, Little Farm (2014)
A Violin for Elva (2015)
A Lucky Author Has a Dog (2015)
Goodnight, Good Dog (2015)
The Thank You Book (2018)
The Friendship Book (2019)
The House of Grass and Sky (2021)

References

1946 births
American children's writers
Living people
American women children's writers
People from Monroe, Louisiana
Writers from Louisiana
Writers from Little Rock, Arkansas
Smith College alumni
University of Delaware alumni
20th-century American writers
20th-century American women writers
21st-century American writers